Konshino is a rural locality (a village) in Kubenskoye Rural Settlement, Vologodsky District, Vologda Oblast, Russia. The population was 38 as of 2002.

Geography 
Konshino is located 33 km northwest of Vologda (the district's administrative centre) by road. Kashkalino is the nearest rural locality.

References 

Rural localities in Vologodsky District